A thunk is type of computer software subroutine.

Thunk may also refer to:

 Thunk, a character from the animated TV series Dawn of the Croods
 "Thunk", a track from the 1971 album Bark by Jefferson Airplane
 "Thunk", a 1990 album by American rock band Eleven

See also
 "Thunk in the Trunk", an episode of the American sitcom Modern Family